The 1974 Prince Edward Island general election was held on April 29, 1974.

This election was the first that the New Democratic Party contested as a provincial party on PEI, and the first third party to run candidates since the Co-operative Commonwealth Federation, the NDP's predecessor, contested their last election in 1951.

Party standings

Members elected

The Legislature of Prince Edward Island had two levels of membership from 1893 to 1996 - Assemblymen and Councillors. This was a holdover from when the Island had a bicameral legislature, the General Assembly and the Legislative Council.

In 1893, the Legislative Council was abolished and had its membership merged with the Assembly, though the two titles remained separate and were elected by different electoral franchises. Assembleymen were elected by all eligible voters of within a district. Before 1963, Councillors were only elected by landowners within a district, but afterward were elected in the same manner as Assemblymen.

Kings

Prince

Queens

Sources

Further reading
 

1974 elections in Canada
Elections in Prince Edward Island
1974 in Prince Edward Island
April 1974 events in Canada